Colura is a genus of epiphytic liverworts and consists of approximately 60 species that are distributed mostly in the tropics. Species in this genus are no larger than a couple millimetres in size and may possess small water sac organs formed from fused leaf margins that trap small ciliates. It is because of this trapping mechanism that some species have been suspected of carnivory, even as early as 1893. One such species, Colura zoophaga, was the subject of a study that aimed to investigate the assumed carnivorous habit among liverworts. The results confirmed that ciliates were captured and died within the water sac traps, which are not unlike the bladder traps of Utricularia. Whether the species attract, digest, or absorb the prey has not been confirmed, however. The epiphytic habit of the genus, requiring all nutrients to be acquired from rainwater, is similar to the habit of known carnivorous plants.

Species 

Colura acroloba
Colura ari
Colura australiensis
Colura bisvoluta
Colura calderae
Colura calyptrifolia
Colura conica
Colura crispiloba
Colura fistulosa
Colura irrorata
Colura leratii
Colura pulcherrima
Colura queenslandica
Colura saccophylla
Colura simplicior
Colura superba
Colura tenuicornis
Colura zoophaga

References 

Porellales genera
Lejeuneaceae